Calligrapha diversa is a species of leaf beetle in the family Chrysomelidae. It was first described by Carl Stål in 1859. It is found across Central America and North America. It's feeds on plants in the Malvaceae family, such as Malva parviflora and Sphaeralcae angustifolia, and Solanaceae like Solanum nigrescens.

References

External links

 

Chrysomelinae
Beetles described in 1859